General elections were held in Romania in June 1931. The Chamber of Deputies was elected on 1 June, whilst the Senate was elected in three stages on 4, 6 and 8 June. The result was a victory for the governing National Union, an alliance of the National Party, the National Liberal Party, the German Party, the Agrarian Union Party, the Vlad Ţepeş League, the Agrarian League and several other parties. The Union won 289 of the 387 seats in the Chamber of Deputies and 108 of the 113 seats in the Senate elected through universal vote. The five seats won by the Communist-dominated Peasant Workers' Bloc were ultimately invalidated by the new Parliament.

Results

Chamber of Deputies

Senate

Notes

References

Parliamentary elections in Romania
Romania
General
Election and referendum articles with incomplete results
June 1931 events
1931 elections in Romania